The Hebrew Bible: A Translation with Commentary is an English translation of the Hebrew Bible completed by Robert Alter in 2018. It was written over the course of two decades.

Alter's translation is considered unique in its being a one-man translation of the entire Hebrew Bible. Moreover, while most translations aimed to preserve theological accuracy, Alter's translation aims to convey the literary style of the original Hebrew text in English, recreating as much as possible its poetic rhythms and metaphors. The translation is accompanied by a short commentary to elucidate the text. It has been praised for its elegant prose style by scholars of comparative literature, such as Ilana Pardes, and even Bible scholars like Yair Zakovitch of the Hebrew University. Other scholars, however, such as Edward Greenstein of Bar-Ilan University’s Bible department, have criticized the work for alleged inaccuracies.

References

Further reading 

 
 
 
 
 Regt, Lénart J. de. 2022. "Robert Alter's New Translation of the Hebrew Bible: An Assessment for Translators." The Bible Translator 73.2:157-173.
 
 
 
Tioyé, Samy Ikoa. 2022. "Robert Alter's Translation of the Hebrew Bible: A Response to Lénart de Regt. The Bible Translator 73.2:174-180.

External links 
 

Bible translations into English
2018 non-fiction books
W. W. Norton & Company books
Hebrew Bible versions and translations